Avicularia glauca is a species of spider in the family Theraphosidae, found in Panama. The species was first described by Eugène Simon in 1891. , only a single female preserved specimen is known. It appears to be closely related to Avicularia purpurea. Avicularia species are rare in southern Central America; further studies are in progress.

References

Theraphosidae
Spiders of Central America
Spiders described in 1891